Mustapha Fetoui nicknamed Chérif Fetoui  is a Moroccan footballer who played for Morocco in the 1976 and 1978 African Cup of Nations.

Honours

International
Morocco
 Africa Cup of Nations: 1976

Individual
 Africa Cup of Nations Team of the Tournament: 1976

References

External links
11v11 Profile

1945 births
Living people
Moroccan footballers
Morocco international footballers
Africa Cup of Nations-winning players
1976 African Cup of Nations players
1978 African Cup of Nations players
Competitors at the 1975 Mediterranean Games
Botola players
Maghreb de Fès players
Difaâ Hassani El Jadidi players
Association football defenders
Mediterranean Games competitors for Morocco